Mirbelia floribunda, commonly known as purple mirbelia, is a species of flowering plant in the family Fabaceae and is endemic to the south-west of Western Australia. It is an erect, slender or straggling, much-branched shrub with narrowly linear leaves and bluish-purple flowers.

Description
The petals are bluish-purple, the standard petal twice as long as the sepals and the wings shorter than the standard and the keel shorter than the wings.

Taxonomy
Mirbelia floribunda was first formally described in 1839 by John Lindley in A Sketch of the Vegetation of the Swan River Colony from an unpublished manuscript by George Bentham. The specific epithet (floribunda) means "flowering profusely".

Distribution and habitat
Purple mirbelia grows in woodland and kwongan and is found in the Avon Wheatbelt, Esperance Plains, Geraldton Sandplains, Jarrah Forest, Mallee and Swan Coastal Plain bioregions of south-western Western Australia.

Conservation status
This species of pea is listed as "not threatened" by the Government of Western Australia Department of Biodiversity, Conservation and Attractions.

References 

Flora of Western Australia
Plants described in 1839
floribunda
Taxa named by John Lindley